Elizabeth "Lee" Miller, Lady Penrose (April 23, 1907 – July 21, 1977), was an American photographer and photojournalist. She was a fashion model in New York City in the 1920s before going to Paris, where she became a fashion and fine art photographer. During the Second World War, she was a war correspondent for Vogue, covering events such as the London Blitz, the liberation of Paris, and the concentration camps at Buchenwald and Dachau.

Early life 
Miller was born on April 23, 1907, in Poughkeepsie, New York. Her parents were Theodore and Florence Miller (née MacDonald). Her father was of German descent, and her mother was of Scottish and Irish descent. She had a younger brother named Erik, and her older brother was the aviator Johnny Miller. Theodore always favored Lee, and often used her as a model for his amateur photography. When she was seven years old, Lee was raped while staying with a family friend in Brooklyn and was infected with gonorrhea. In her childhood, Miller experienced issues in her formal education, being expelled from almost every school she attended while living in the Poughkeepsie area. In 1925, at 18, Miller moved to Paris where she studied lighting, costume, and design at the Ladislas Medgyes' School of Stagecraft. She returned to New York in 1926 and joined an experimental drama programme at Vassar College, taught by Hallie Flanagan, a pioneer of "experimental theatre". Soon after, Miller left home at 19 to enroll in the Art Students League of New York in Manhattan to study life drawing and painting.

Career

Modeling 
Miller's father introduced her and her brothers to photography at an early age. She was his model – he took many stereoscopic photographs of his nude teenage daughter – and showed her technical aspects of the art. At 19 she nearly stepped in front of a car on a Manhattan street but was prevented by Condé Nast, the publisher of Vogue. Miller's look was what Vogue'''s then editor-in-chief Edna Woolman Chase was looking for to represent the emerging idea of the "modern girl".

For the next two years, Miller was one of the most sought-after models in New York, photographed by leading fashion photographers, including Edward Steichen, Arnold Genthe, Nickolas Muray, and George Hoyningen-Huene. Kotex used a photograph of Miller by Steichen to advertise their menstrual pads  without her consent, effectively ending her career as a fashion model. She was hired by a fashion designer in 1929 to make drawings of fashion details in Renaissance paintings but, in time, grew tired of this and found photography more efficient.

 Photography 

In 1929, Miller traveled to Paris intending to apprentice with the surrealist artist and photographer Man Ray. Although, at first, he insisted that he did not take students, Miller soon became his model and collaborator (announcing to him, "I'm your new student"), as well as his lover and muse."Surrealist Love Affair of Man Ray and Lee Miller Exposed in San Francisco Museum Show" by Jonathon Keats, ForbesGiovanni, Janine D. "What's a Girl to Do When a Battle Lands in Her Lap?" The New York Times Magazine, Winter 2007: 68–71. ProQuest. March 2, 2017 While in Paris, she began her own photographic studio, often taking over Man Ray's fashion assignments to enable him to concentrate on his painting. They collaborated so closely in this period that some photographs taken by Miller are credited to Man Ray. Together with Man Ray, she rediscovered the photographic technique of solarisation through an accident variously described; one of Miller's accounts involved a mouse running over her foot, causing her to switch on the light in mid-development.

The couple made the technique a distinctive visual signature, examples being Man Ray's solarised portrait of Miller taken in Paris circa 1930, and Miller's portraits of fellow surrealist Meret Oppenheim (1930), Miller's friend Dorothy Hill (1933), and the silent film star Lilian Harvey (1933).

Solarisation fits the surrealist principle of the unconscious accident being integral to art and evokes the style's appeal to the irrational or paradoxical in combining opposites of positive and negative. Mark Haworth-Booth describes solarisation as "a perfect surrealist medium in which positive and negative occur simultaneously, as if in a dream".

Among Miller's friends were Pablo Picasso and fellow surrealists Paul Éluard and Jean Cocteau. Cocteau was so mesmerized by Miller's beauty that he transformed her into a plaster cast of a classical statue for his film, The Blood of a Poet (1930).Bukhari, Nuzhat, and Amir Feshareki. "Lee Miller's Ariadne Aesthetics", Modernism/Modernity 14.1 (2007): 147–152. ProQuest. March 2, 2017 During a dispute with Man Ray regarding the attribution of their co-produced work, Man Ray is said to have slashed an image of Miller's neck with a razor.

After leaving Man Ray and Paris in 1932, she returned to New York City. She established a portrait and commercial photography studio (with $10,000 worth of backing from Christian Holmes II and Cliff Smith) with her brother Erik (who had worked for the fashion photographer Toni von Horn) as her darkroom assistant. Miller rented two apartments in a building one block from Radio City Music Hall. One of the apartments became her home, while the other became the Lee Miller Studio. Clients of the Lee Miller Studio included BBDO, Henry Sell, Elizabeth Arden, Helena Rubinstein, Saks Fifth Avenue, I. Magnin and Co., and Jay Thorpe. During 1932 Miller was included in the Modern European Photography exhibition at the Julien Levy Gallery in New York and the Brooklyn Museum's exhibition International Photographers with László Moholy-Nagy, Cecil Beaton, Margaret Bourke-White, Tina Modotti, Charles Sheeler, Man Ray, and Edward Weston. In response to the exhibition, Katherine Grant Sterne wrote a review in Parnassus in March 1932, noting that Miller "has retained more of her American character in the Paris milieu. The very beautiful Bird Cages at Brooklyn; the study of a pink-nailed hand embedded in curly blond hair which is included in both the Brooklyn and the Julien Levy show; and the brilliant print of a white statue against a black drop, illumine the fact rather than distort it."

In 1933, Julien Levy gave Miller the only solo exhibition of her life. Among her portrait clients were the surrealist artist Joseph Cornell, actresses Lilian Harvey and Gertrude Lawrence, and the African-American cast of the Virgil Thomson–Gertrude Stein opera Four Saints in Three Acts (1934).

In 1934, Miller abandoned her studio to marry the Egyptian businessman and engineer Aziz Eloui Bey, who had come to New York City to buy equipment for the Egyptian National Railways. Although she did not work as a professional photographer during this period, the photographs she took while living in Egypt with Eloui, including Portrait of Space, are regarded as some of her most striking surrealist images. In Cairo, Miller took a photograph of the desert near Siwa that Magritte saw and used as inspiration for his 1938 painting Le Baiser. Miller also contributed an object to the Surrealist Objects and Poems exhibition at the London Gallery in 1934.

By 1937, Miller had grown bored with her life in Cairo. She returned to Paris, where she met the British surrealist painter and curator Roland Penrose. 

Four of her photographs ("Egypt" (1939), "Roumania" (1938), "Libya" (1939), and "Sinai" (1939)) were displayed at the Zwemmer Gallery's 1940 exhibition, Surrealism To-Day. The Museum of Modern Art (MoMA) included her work in the exhibition Britain at War in New York City in 1941. Another exhibition would not include her photographs until 1955 when she was included in the renowned The Family of Man exhibition curated by Edward Steichen, director of the MoMA Department of Photography.

 World War II 

At the outbreak of World War II, Miller was living at Downshire Hill in Hampstead in London with Penrose when the bombing of the city began. Ignoring pleas from friends and family to return to the US, Miller embarked on a new career in photojournalism as the official war photographer for Vogue, documenting the Blitz. She was accredited with the U.S. Army as a war correspondent for Condé Nast Publications from December 1942.

Miller's first article for British Vogue was on nurses at an army base in Oxford. Miller took portraits of nurses across Europe, including those on the front lines and prisoners of war.

She teamed up with the American photographer David E. Scherman, a Life correspondent, on many assignments. She traveled to France less than a month after D-Day and recorded the first use of napalm at the siege of St. Malo, as well as the liberation of Paris, the Battle of Alsace, and the horror of the Nazi concentration camps at Buchenwald and Dachau. Scherman's photograph of Miller in the bathtub of Adolf Hitler's apartment in Munich, with its shower hose looped in the center behind her head and the dust of Dachau on her boots deliberately dirtying Hitler's bathroom, is one of the most iconic images from the Miller–Scherman partnership, and occurred on April 30, 1945, coincidentally the same day as Hitler's suicide. Being one of the first to arrive at Hitler's apartments, Miller admits, "I had his address in my pocket for years." After taking the bathtub picture, Miller took a bath in the tub and slept in Hitler's bed.

During this period, Miller photographed dying children in a Vienna hospital, peasant life in post-war Hungary, corpses of Nazi officers and their families, and finally, the execution of Prime Minister László Bárdossy. After the war, she continued working for Vogue for another two years, covering fashion and celebrities.

During Miller's work with Vogue in World War II, it became her goal to "document war as historical evidence". The effect of her work was to provide "context for events". Her work was very specific and surrealist, like her previous publications and modelling with Vogue.  She spent time composing her photographs, famously framing them from inside the cattle trains. Miller's work with Vogue during wartime was often a combination of journalism and art, often manipulated to evoke emotion.

At the war's end, Miller's work as a wartime photojournalist continued as she sent telegrams back to the British Vogue editor, Audrey Withers, urging her to publish photographs from the camps. She did this following a CBS broadcast from Buchenwald by Edward R. Murrow, and Richard Dimbleby's BBC broadcast from inside Bergen-Belsen. This was a consequence of people's disbelief at such atrocities. These broadcasters used photographers to do what they could to show the public what they saw. During World War II, Miller's work was used predominantly to "provide an eye-witness account" of the casualties of war.

 Life in Britain 
After returning to Britain from central Europe, Miller suffered severe episodes of clinical depression and what later became known as post-traumatic stress disorder (PTSD). She began to drink heavily and became uncertain about her future. 

In November 1946, she was commissioned by British Vogue to illustrate the article "When James Joyce Lived in Dublin" by Joyce's old friend and confidant Constantine Curran. Following a list given to her by Curran, Miller photographed numerous places and people in Dublin, many with a connection to Joyce. The article and photographs appeared in American Vogue in May 1947 and British Vogue in 1950. The pictures provide a remarkable record of Joyce's hometown and Dublin during that time. In 1946, she travelled with Penrose to the United States, where she visited Man Ray in California. After she discovered she was pregnant by Penrose with her only son, she divorced Bey and, on May 3, 1947, married Penrose. Their son, Antony Penrose, was born in September 1947.

In 1949, the couple bought Farley Farm House in Chiddingly, East Sussex. During the 1950s and 1960s, Farley Farm became a sort of artistic Mecca for visiting artists such as Picasso, Man Ray, Henry Moore, Eileen Agar, Jean Dubuffet, Dorothea Tanning, and Max Ernst. While Miller continued to do the occasional photo shoot for Vogue, she soon discarded the darkroom for the kitchen, becoming a gourmet cook. According to her housekeeper Patsy, she specialized in "historical food" like roast suckling pig as well as treats such as marshmallows in a cola sauce (especially made to annoy English critic Cyril Connolly who told her Americans didn't know how to cook). She also provided photographs for her husband's biographies of Picasso and Antoni Tàpies. However, images from the war, especially the concentration camps, continued to haunt her, and she started on what her son later described as a "downward spiral". Her depression may have been accelerated by her husband's long affair with the trapeze artist Diane Deriaz.

Miller was investigated by the British security service MI5 during the 1940s and 1950s, on suspicion of being a Soviet spy.

In October 1969, Miller was asked in an interview with a New York Times reporter what drew her to photography. Her response was that it was "a matter of getting out on a damn limb and sawing it off behind you".

 Death 
Miller died of cancer at Farley Farm House in 1977, aged 70. She was cremated, and her ashes were spread through her herb garden at Farley.

 Legacy 
Miller's work has served as inspiration for Gucci's Frida Giannini, Ann Demeulemeester, and Alexander McQueen. Playwright David Hare comments, "Today, when the mark of a successful iconographer is to offer craven worship of wealth, or yet more craven worship of power and celebrity, it is impossible to imagine an artist of Lee's subtlety and humanity commanding the resources of a mass-market magazine." Mark Haworth-Booth, curator of The Art of Lee Miller, has said "her photographs shocked people out of their comfort zone" and that "she had a chip of ice in her heart...she got very close to things...Margaret Bourke-White was far away from the fighting, but Lee was close. That's what makes the difference--Lee was prepared to shock."

In 1932, for the Poughkeepsie Evening Star, Miller stated that photography was "perfectly suited to women as a profession...it seems to me that women have a bigger chance at success in photography than men...women are quicker and more adaptable than men. And I think they have an intuition that helps them understand personalities more quickly than men."

Throughout her life, Miller did very little to promote her photographic work. That Miller's work is known today is mainly due to the efforts of her son, Antony Penrose, who has been studying, conserving, and promoting his mother's work since the early 1980s. He discovered sixty thousand or so photographs, negatives, documents, journals, cameras, love letters, and souvenirs in cardboard boxes and trunks in Farley Farm's attic after his mother's death. He owns the house and offers tours of the works of Miller and Penrose. The house is home to the private collections of Miller and Penrose, their work, and some of their favourite art pieces. In the dining room, the fireplace was decorated in vivid colours by Penrose. Her pictures are accessible at the Lee Miller Archive.

In 1985, Penrose published the first biography of Miller, entitled The Lives of Lee Miller. Since then, a number of books, mostly accompanying exhibitions of her photographs, have been written by art historians and writers such as Jane Livingstone, Richard Calvocoressi, and Haworth-Booth. Penrose and David Scherman collaborated on the book Lee Miller's War: Photographer and Correspondent With the Allies in Europe 1944–45, in 1992. Interviews with Penrose form the core of the 1995 documentary Lee Miller: Through the Mirror, made with Scherman and writer-director Sylvain Roumette. The audiobook Surrealism Reviewed was published in 2002, and a 1946 radio interview with Miller can be heard on it.

A blue plaque was attached to Miller's and Penrose's residence at 21 Downshire Hill, Hampstead, London.

In 2005, Miller's life story was turned into a musical, Six Pictures of Lee Miller, with music and lyrics by British composer Jason Carr. It premiered at the Chichester Festival Theatre, West Sussex. Also in 2005, Carolyn Burke's substantial biography, Lee Miller, A Life, was published.

In 2007, Traces of Lee Miller: Echoes from St. Malo, an interactive CD and DVD about Miller's war photography in St. Malo, was released with the support of Hand Productions and Sussex University.

In 2015, an exhibition of Miller's photographs at the Scottish National Portrait Gallery, Lee Miller and Picasso, focussed "on the relationship between Lee Miller, Roland Penrose and Pablo Picasso". In the same year, a work of historical fiction, The Woman in the Photograph, by Dana Gynther, was published. It builds its story around Miller's affair with Man Ray in Paris circa 1930.

In 2019, a work of historical fiction, The Age of Light, by Whitney Scharer, was published. It tells the story of Miller's life, work, and relationship with Man Ray.

Penrose's 1985 biography will be the basis for a film by Ellen Kuras, Lee'', to be released in 2023, featuring Kate Winslet as Lee Miller.

References

Further reading

External links 

 Lee Miller Archives official site
 Lee Miller: Artist Chronology Museum of Modern Art
 Farleys House and Gallery official site
 Six Pictures of Lee Miller by Jason Carr, about the musical
  – article discussing the relationship between Miller and Picasso

1907 births
1977 deaths
Art Students League of New York alumni
20th-century American photographers
American artists' models
American expatriates in the United Kingdom
American photojournalists
Fine art photographers
Muses
Photographers from New York (state)
People from Poughkeepsie, New York
Photography in Egypt
Photography in Germany
American surrealist artists
American war photographers
American war correspondents of World War II
Women surrealist artists
20th-century American women photographers
Women photojournalists